Imran Ahmad (born 22 April 1948) is a Bangladesh Awami League politician, businessman and the Minister of Expatriates' Welfare and Overseas Employment since 2019. He is a member of parliament from Sylhet-4.

Early life and education
Imran was born into a Bengali Muslim family in the city of Demra, Bengal Presidency, British India. His father was Harun Sheikh and his mother was Mst. Yanur Begum. Their home was in Jessore in Manirampur Upazila. He completed his SSC education at the Bawany High School in Demra and finished his upper education. He graduated from the University of Dhaka with a Bachelor of Arts in geography.

Career
Imran  was elected a Member of Parliament from Sylhet-4 constituency in 1983 as a candidate of Bangladesh Awami League in the third parliamentary elections. He was elected a Member of Parliament from Sylhet-4 constituency as a candidate of Bangladesh Awami League in the 5th Parliamentary Election of 1991. He was then elected as a Member of Parliament from Sylhet-4 constituency as a candidate of Bangladesh Awami League in the by-election of September 1996.  He was later elected as a Member of Parliament from Sylhet-4 constituency as a candidate of Bangladesh Awami League in the 10th Parliamentary Election of 2014. He was later elected as a Member of Parliament from Sylhet-4 constituency as a candidate of Bangladesh Awami League in the Eleventh Parliamentary Election of 2018.

References

Living people
1948 births
People from Sylhet District
Faujdarhat Cadet College alumni
University of Dhaka alumni
Awami League politicians
Expatriates' Welfare and Overseas Employment ministers
State Ministers of Expatriates' Welfare and Overseas Employment (Bangladesh)
3rd Jatiya Sangsad members
5th Jatiya Sangsad members
7th Jatiya Sangsad members
10th Jatiya Sangsad members
11th Jatiya Sangsad members